The AACTA Award for Best International Film is an award presented by the Australian Academy of Cinema and Television Arts (AACTA), a non-profit organisation whose aim is to "identify, award, promote, and celebrate Australia's greatest achievements in film and television". The award is presented at the annual AACTA International Awards, which hand out accolades for achievements in feature films, regardless of where the film was made.

From 1992 to 2004, a similar award was presented by the Australian Film Institute (AFI), the Academy's parent organisation. It was known as the AFI Award for Best Foreign Film and was handed out at the annual Australian Film Institute Awards (known as the AFI Awards).

Winners and nominees
The winner is highlighted first and highlighted in boldface.

2010s

2020s

See also
 AACTA Awards
 AACTA Award for Best Film
 Australian Film Institute Award for Best Foreign Film

References

External links
 

F
Awards for best film